9 (nine) is the natural number following  and preceding .

Evolution of the Arabic digit 

In the beginning, various Indians wrote a digit 9 similar in shape to the modern closing question mark without the bottom dot. The Kshatrapa, Andhra and Gupta started curving the bottom vertical line coming up with a -look-alike. The Nagari continued the bottom stroke to make a circle and enclose the 3-look-alike, in much the same way that the sign @ encircles a lowercase a. As time went on, the enclosing circle became bigger and its line continued beyond the circle downwards, as the 3-look-alike became smaller. Soon, all that was left of the 3-look-alike was a squiggle. The Arabs simply connected that squiggle to the downward stroke at the middle and subsequent European change was purely cosmetic.

The modern digit resembles an inverted 6. To disambiguate the two on objects and documents that can be inverted, they are often underlined. Another distinction from the 6 is that it is sometimes handwritten with two strokes and a straight stem, resembling a raised lower-case letter q. In seven-segment display, the number 9 can be constructed either with a hook at the end of its stem or without one. Most LCD calculators use the former, but some VFD models use the latter.

Mathematics 
Nine is the fourth composite number, and the first composite number that is odd. 9 is the highest single-digit number in the decimal system. It is the third square number (32), and the second non-unitary square prime of the form p2 and first that is odd, with all subsequent squares of this form odd as well.

By Mihăilescu's theorem, 9 is the only positive perfect power that is one more than another positive perfect power, since the square of 3 is one more than the cube of 2.

Nine is the number of derangements of 4, or the number of permutations of four elements with no fixed points.

A number that is 4 or 5 modulo 9 cannot be represented as the sum of three cubes.

Nine is the sum of the first three nonzero factorials  It is also the third exponential factorial, since .

(See six nines in pi).

The first non-trivial magic square is a  x  magic square made of nine cells, with a magic constant of 15.  Meanwhile, a  x  magic square has a magic constant of 369.

9 is a Motzkin number, for the number of ways of drawing non-intersecting chords between four points on a circle.

A polygon with nine sides is called a nonagon.

Also an enneagon, a regular nonagon is able to fill a plane-vertex alongside an equilateral triangle and a regular 18-sided octadecagon (3.9.18), and as such, it is one of only nine polygons that are able to fill a plane-vertex without uniformly tiling the plane. 

There are nine distinct uniform colorings of the triangular tiling and the square tiling, which are the two simplest regular tilings; the hexagonal tiling, on the other hand, has three distinct uniform colorings.

There are a maximum of nine semiregular Archimedean tilings by convex regular polygons, when including chiral forms of the snub hexagonal tiling.   

There are nine uniform edge-transitive convex polyhedra in three dimensions:
the five regular Platonic solids: the tetrahedron, octahedron, cube, dodecahedron and icosahedron;
the two quasiregular Archimedean solids: the cuboctahedron and the icosidodecahedron; and
two Catalan solids: the rhombic dodecahedron and the rhombic triacontahedron, which are duals to the only two quasiregular polyhedra.

Nine distinct stellation's by Miller's rules are produced by the truncated tetrahedron. It is the simplest Archimedean solid, with a total of four equilateral triangular and four hexagonal faces.

In four-dimensional space, there are nine paracompact hyperbolic honeycomb Coxeter groups, as well as nine regular compact hyperbolic honeycombs from regular convex and star polychora. There are also nine uniform demitesseractic Euclidean honeycombs in the fourth dimension.

There are only three types of Coxeter groups of uniform figures in dimensions nine and thereafter, aside from the many families of prisms and proprisms: the  simplex groups, the  hypercube groups, and the  demihypercube groups. The ninth dimension is also the final dimension that contains Coxeter-Dynkin diagrams as uniform solutions in hyperbolic space. Inclusive of compact hyperbolic solutions, there are a total of 238 compact and paracompact Coxeter-Dynkin diagrams between dimensions two and nine, or equivalently between ranks three and ten. The most important of the last  paracompact groups is the group   with 1023 total honeycombs, the simplest of which is 621 whose vertex figure is the 521 honeycomb: the vertex arrangement of the densest-possible packing of spheres in 8 dimensions which forms the  lattice. The 621 honeycomb is made of 9-simplexes and 9-orthoplexes, with 1023 total polytope elements making up each 9-simplex. It is the final honeycomb figure with infinite facets and vertex figures in the k21 family of semiregular polytopes, first defined by Thorold Gosset in 1900.

There are nine Heegner numbers, or square-free positive integers  that yield an imaginary quadratic field  whose ring of integers has a unique factorization, or class number of 1.

In decimal 
A positive number is divisible by nine if and only if its digital root is nine:
2 × 9 = 18 (1 + 8 = 9)
3 × 9 = 27 (2 + 7 = 9)
9 × 9 = 81 (8 + 1 = 9)
121 × 9 = 1089 (1 + 0 + 8 + 9 = 18; 1 + 8 = 9)
234 × 9 = 2106 (2 + 1 + 0 + 6 = 9)
578329 × 9 = 5204961 (5 + 2 + 0 + 4 + 9 + 6 + 1 = 27; 2 + 7 = 9)
482729235601 × 9 = 4344563120409 (4 + 3 + 4 + 4 + 5 + 6 + 3 + 1 + 2 + 0 + 4 + 0 + 9 = 45; 4 + 5 = 9)

That is, if any natural number is multiplied by 9, and the digits of the answer are repeatedly added until it is just one digit, the sum will be nine. 

In base-, the divisors of  have such a property, which makes 3 the only other number aside from 9 in decimal that shares this property. Another consequence of 9 being  is that it is a Kaprekar number.

There are other interesting patterns involving multiples of nine:
12345679 × 9 = 111111111
12345679 × 18 = 222222222
12345679 × 81 = 999999999

The difference between a base-10 positive integer and the sum of its digits is a whole multiple of nine. Examples:
The sum of the digits of 41 is 5, and 41 − 5 = 36. The digital root of 36 is 3 + 6 = 9.
The sum of the digits of 35967930 is 3 + 5 + 9 + 6 + 7 + 9 + 3 + 0 = 42, and 35967930 − 42 = 35967888. The digital root of 35967888 is 3 + 5 + 9 + 6 + 7 + 8 + 8 + 8 = 54, 5 + 4 = 9.

If dividing a number by the amount of 9s corresponding to its number of digits, the number is turned into a repeating decimal. (e.g. )

Casting out nines is a quick way of testing the calculations of sums, differences, products, and quotients of integers known as long ago as the 12th century.

List of basic calculations

Alphabets and codes 
In the NATO phonetic alphabet, the digit 9 is called "Niner".
Five-digit produce PLU codes that begin with 9 indicate organic foods.

Culture and mythology

Indian culture 
Nine is a number that appears often in Indian culture and mythology. Some instances are enumerated below.
Nine influencers are attested in Indian astrology.
In the Vaisheshika branch of Hindu philosophy, there are nine universal substances or elements: Earth, Water, Air, Fire, Ether, Time, Space, Soul, and Mind.
Navaratri is a nine-day festival dedicated to the nine forms of Durga.
Navaratna, meaning "nine jewels" may also refer to Navaratnas – accomplished courtiers, Navratan – a kind of dish, or a form of architecture.
In Indian aesthetics, there are nine kinds of Rasa.

Chinese culture 
Nine is considered a good number in Chinese culture because it sounds the same as the word "long-lasting".
Nine is strongly associated with the Chinese dragon, a symbol of magic and power. There are nine forms of the dragon, it is described in terms of nine attributes, and it has nine children. It has 117 scales – 81 yang (masculine, heavenly) and 36 yin (feminine, earthly). All three numbers are multiples of 9 as well as having the same digital root of 9.
The dragon often symbolizes the Emperor, and the number nine can be found in many ornaments in the Forbidden City.
The circular altar platform (Earthly Mount) of the Temple of Heaven has one circular marble plate in the center, surrounded by a ring of nine plates, then by a ring of 18 plates, and so on, for a total of nine rings, with the outermost having 
The name of the area called Kowloon in Hong Kong literally means: nine dragons.
The nine-dotted line delimits certain island claims by China in the South China Sea.
The nine-rank system was a civil service nomination system used during certain Chinese dynasties.
9 Points of the Heart (Heal) / Heart Master (Immortality) Channels in Traditional Chinese Medicine.

Ancient Egypt 
The nine bows is a term used in Ancient Egypt to represent the traditional enemies of Egypt.
The Ennead is a group of nine Egyptian deities, who, in some versions of the Osiris myth, judged whether Horus or Set should inherit Egypt.

European culture 
The Nine Worthies are nine historical, or semi-legendary figures who, in the Middle Ages, were believed to personify the ideals of chivalry.
In Norse mythology, the universe is divided into nine worlds which are all connected by the world tree Yggdrasil
In Norse mythology as well, the number nine is associated with Odin, as that is how many days he hung from the world tree Yggdrasil before attaining knowledge of the runes.

Greek mythology 
The nine Muses in Greek mythology are Calliope (epic poetry), Clio (history), Erato (erotic poetry), Euterpe (lyric poetry), Melpomene (tragedy), Polyhymnia (song), Terpsichore (dance), Thalia (comedy), and Urania (astronomy).
It takes nine days (for an anvil) to fall from heaven to earth, and nine more to fall from earth to Tartarus.
Leto labored for nine days and nine nights for Apollo, according to the Homeric Hymn to Delian Apollo.

Mesoamerican mythology 
 The Lords of the Night, is a group of nine deities who each ruled over every ninth night forming a calendrical cycle

Aztec mythology 
 Mictlan the underworld in Aztec mythology, consists of nine levels.

Mayan mythology 
 The Mayan underworld Xibalba consists of nine levels.
 El Castillo, the Mayan step-pyramid in Chichén Itzá, consists of nine steps. It is said that this was done to represent the nine levels of Xibalba.

Anthropology

Idioms 
"to go the whole nine yards-"
"A cat-o'-nine-tails suggests perfect punishment and atonement." – Robert Ripley.
"A cat has nine lives"
"to be on cloud nine"
"A stitch in time saves nine"
"found true 9 out of 10 times"
"possession is nine tenths of the law"
The word "K-9" pronounces the same as canine and is used in many US police departments to denote the police dog unit. Despite not sounding like the translation of the word canine in other languages, many police and military units around the world use the same designation.
Someone dressed "to the nines" is dressed up as much as they can be.
In North American urban culture, "nine" is a slang word for a 9mm pistol or homicide, the latter from the Illinois Criminal Code for homicide.

Society 
The 9 on Yahoo!, hosted by Maria Sansone, was a daily video compilation show, or vlog, on Yahoo! featuring the nine top "web finds" of the day.
Nine justices sit on the United States Supreme Court.
Nine justices sit on the Supreme Court of Canada.

Technique 

Stanines, a method of scaling test scores, range from 1 to 9.
There are 9 square feet in a square yard.

Pseudoscience 
 In Pythagorean numerology the number 9 symbolizes the end of one cycle and the beginning of another.

Literature 
There are nine circles of Hell in Dante's Divine Comedy.
The Nine Bright Shiners, characters in Garth Nix's Old Kingdom trilogy. The Nine Bright Shiners was a 1930s book of poems by Anne Ridler and a 1988 fiction book by Anthea Fraser; the name derives from "a very curious old semi-pagan, semi-Christian" song.
The Nine Tailors is a 1934 mystery novel by British writer Dorothy L. Sayers, her ninth featuring sleuth Lord Peter Wimsey.
Nine Unknown Men are, in occult legend, the custodians of the sciences of the world since ancient times.
In J. R. R. Tolkien's Middle-earth, there are nine rings of power given to men, and consequently, nine ringwraiths. Additionally, The Fellowship of the Ring consists of nine companions.
In Lorien Legacies there are nine Garde sent to Earth.
Number Nine is a character in Lorien Legacies.
In the series A Song of Ice and Fire, there are nine regions of Westeros (the Crownlands, the North, the Riverlands, the Westerlands, the Reach, the Stormlands, the Vale of Arryn, the Iron Islands and Dorne). Additionally, there is a group of nine city-states in western Essos known collectively as the Free Cities (Braavos, Lorath, Lys, Myr, Norvos, Pentos, Qohor, Tyrosh and Volantis).
In The Wheel of Time series, Daughter of the Nine Moons is the title given to the heir to the throne of Seanchan, and the Court of the Nine Moons serves as the throne room of the Seanchan rulers themselves. Additionally, the nation of Illian is partially governed by a body known as the Council of Nine, and the flag of Illian displays nine golden bees on it. Furthermore, in the Age of Legends, the Nine Rods of Dominion were nine regional governors who administered individual areas of the world under the ruling world government.

Organizations 
Divine Nine – The National Pan-Hellenic Council (NPHC) is a collaborative organization of nine historically African American, international Greek-lettered fraternities and sororities.

Places and thoroughfares 
List of highways numbered 9
Ninth Avenue is a major avenue in Manhattan.
South Africa has 9 provinces
 Negeri Sembilan, a Malaysian state located in Peninsular Malaysia, is named as such as it was historically a confederation of nine settlements (nagari) of the Minangkabau migrated from West Sumatra.

Religion and philosophy 

Nine, as the highest single-digit number (in base ten), symbolizes completeness in the Baháʼí Faith. In addition, the word Baháʼ in the Abjad notation has a value of 9, and a 9-pointed star is used to symbolize the religion.
The number 9 is revered in Hinduism and considered a complete, perfected and divine number because it represents the end of a cycle in the decimal system, which originated from the Indian subcontinent as early as 3000 BC.
In Buddhism, Gautama Buddha was believed to have nine virtues, which he was (1) Accomplished, (2) Perfectly Enlightened, (3) Endowed with knowledge and Conduct or Practice, (4) Well-gone or Well-spoken, (5) the Knower of worlds, (6) the Guide Unsurpassed of men to be tamed, (7) the Teacher of gods and men, (8) Enlightened, and (9) Blessed.
Important Buddhist rituals usually involve nine monks.
The first nine days of the Hebrew month of Av are collectively known as "The Nine Days" (Tisha HaYamim), and are a period of semi-mourning leading up to Tisha B'Av, the ninth day of Av on which both Temples in Jerusalem were destroyed.
Nine is a significant number in Norse Mythology. Odin hung himself on an ash tree for nine days to learn the runes.
The Fourth Way Enneagram is one system of knowledge which shows the correspondence between the 9 integers and the circle.
In the Christian angelic hierarchy there are 9 choirs of angels.
Ramadan, the month of fasting and prayer, is the ninth month of the Islamic calendar.
Tian's Trigram Number, of Feng Shui, in Taoism.
In Christianity there are nine Fruit of the Holy Spirit which followers are expected to have: love, joy, peace, patience, kindness, goodness, faithfulness, gentleness, and self-control.
The Bible recorded that Christ died at the 9th hour of the day (3 pm).

Science

Astronomy 
Before 2006 (when Pluto was officially designated as a non-planet), there were nine planets in the Solar System.
Messier object M9 is a magnitude 9.0 globular cluster in the constellation Ophiuchus.
The New General Catalogue object NGC 9, a spiral galaxy in the constellation Pegasus.

Chemistry 
The purity of chemicals (see Nine (purity)).
Nine is the atomic number of fluorine.

Physiology 
A human pregnancy normally lasts nine months, the basis of Naegele's rule.

Psychology 
Common terminal digit in psychological pricing.

Sports 

Nine-ball is the standard professional pocket billiards variant played in the United States.
In association football (soccer), the centre-forward/striker traditionally (since at least the fifties) wears the number 9 shirt.
In baseball:
There are nine players on the field including the pitcher.
There are nine innings in a standard game.
9 represents the right fielder's position.
NINE: A Journal of Baseball History and Culture, published by the University of Nebraska Press
In rugby league, the jersey number assigned to the hooker in most competitions. (An exception is the Super League, which uses static squad numbering.)
In rugby union, the number worn by the starting scrum-half.

Technology 

ISO 9 is the ISO's standard for the transliteration of Cyrillic characters into Latin characters
In the Rich Text Format specification, 9 is the language code for the English language. All codes for regional variants of English are congruent to 9 mod 256.
The9 Limited (owner of the9.com) is a company in the video-game industry, including former ties to the extremely popular MMORPG World of Warcraft.

Music 
"Revolution 9", a sound collage which appears on The Beatles' eponymous 1968 album The Beatles (aka The White Album), prominently features a loop of a man's voice repeating the phrase "Number nine".
There are 9 semitones in a Major 6th interval in music.
There was a superstition among some notable classical music composers that they would die after completing their ninth symphony. Some composers who died after composing their ninth symphony include Ludwig van Beethoven, Anton Bruckner, Antonin Dvorak and Gustav Mahler.

See also 

9 (disambiguation)
0.999...
Cloud Nine
List of highways numbered 9

References

Further reading 
Cecil Balmond, "Number 9, the search for the sigma code" 1998, Prestel 2008, 

Integers
9 (number)
Superstitions about numbers